Akiko Morigami and Saori Obata were the defending champions, but Obata decided to compete in Hyderabad that week. Morigami teamed up with Alina Jidkova and lost in the first round to Gisela Dulko and Patricia Tarabini.

Åsa Svensson and Meilen Tu won the title by defeating Maria Sharapova and Vera Zvonareva 6–4, 7–6(7–0) in the final.

Seeds

Draw

Draw

References
 Official results archive (ITF)
 Official results archive (WTA)

2004 Kroger St. Jude International and the Cellular South Cup
Doubles